Orchard Park station is a historic railway station located at Orchard Park in Erie County, New York. It was constructed in 1911 and served passenger trains until the 1950s.

History

The property includes the passenger depot and brick freight house both constructed in 1911, tracks, a concrete bumper post, a semaphore signal, a portion of the entrance drive, and four period rail cars. The station's plan is based largely on one designed by Henry Hobson Richardson for the 1884 station at Auburndale, Massachusetts, which was demolished in 1961 after 80 years in service.

When the Buffalo, Rochester and Pittsburgh Railway (BR&P) was acquired by the Baltimore and Ohio Railroad, Orchard Park Station became a B&O station. It was a flag stop on day and nighttime trains on the BRP route between Lackawanna Terminal in Buffalo and Baltimore and Ohio Station in Pittsburgh. The B&O terminated passenger service in 1955, eight years before the Chesapeake and Ohio Railway took financial control of the B&O. Freight service operated from Orchard Park until 1979. The station was listed on the National Register of Historic Places in 2007 as the Buffalo, Rochester and Pittsburgh Railroad Station.

References

External links

 Buffalo Rochester & Pittsburgh Depot, Orchard Park, New York - Western New York Railway Historical Society

Railway stations on the National Register of Historic Places in New York (state)
Railway stations in the United States opened in 1911
Museums in Erie County, New York
Railroad museums in New York (state)
Orchard Park BRandP
Former Baltimore and Ohio Railroad stations
1911 establishments in New York (state)
National Register of Historic Places in Erie County, New York